The Falkland steamer duck (Tachyeres brachypterus) is a species of flightless duck found on the Falkland Islands in the South Atlantic Ocean. The steamer ducks get their name from their unconventional swimming behaviour in which they flap their wings and feet on the water in a motion reminiscent of an old paddle steamer. The Falkland steamer duck is one of only two bird species endemic to the Falkland Islands, the other being Cobb's wren.

Taxonomy and systematics 
The Falkland steamer duck is part of the Anseriformes order and the Anatidae family alongside ducks, geese, and swans. It is in the genus Tachyeres with the three other species of steamer ducks, all found in South America. The Falkland steamer duck is most closely related to the flying steamer duck which can also be found in and around the Falkland Islands. It is believed that they might still be able to interbreed. A study from 2012 established that these two species are genetically indistinguishable. However, they tend to reproduce in different geographic areas. Possible hybridization could account for the genetic similarities between the two species. Some scientists have proposed that the flying steamer duck and the Falkland steamer duck should be a single species but more evidence is needed to settle that question.

Evolution of flightlessness 
Steamer ducks are a young group from an evolutionarily point of view and have a last common ancestor believed to have lived about 2 million years ago. This family is of particular interest to scientists because it contains both species capable and incapable of flight. More specifically, scientists believe that they are currently witnessing the evolution of flightlessness happening right in front of their eyes. In fact, both the Falkland steamer duck and the closely-related flying steamer duck contain genetic sequences associated with flight-capable wings and flightless wings. This would suggest that the Falkland steamer ducks have just recently become flightless. However, it is difficult to determine if these specific wing traits have directly evolved because of flightlessness or to support steaming behaviour because these two characteristics appear to have evolved at the same time. Regardless of the these unknowns, the fact that this species has recently become flightless allows scientists to identify specific genes and reconstruct the evolutionary steps necessary to evolve flightlessness with a level of detail that cannot be matched when working with older specimens. In short, the Falkland steamer duck is a promising model organism to study and understand the process behind the evolution of flightlessness in birds.

Description

The Falkland steamer duck measures between 61 and 74 cm in length and has a wingspan of 84 to 94 cm. It is a fairly large species of duck with males weighing between 3300 and 4800 g, and females between 2900 and 4196 g. The male's plumage is brown to grey with a contrasting light grey-white head. They have a very distinctive orange bill. The wings have white secondary feathers and large, featherless spurs. The stubby tail is brown-grey. The eyes are brown with a contrasting white eye-ring and a faint white eye-streak. The females are darker in colour with a brown neck and head, and an olive green beak. Females also have a distinctive white eye ring and a white line behind their eyes. Both males and females have characteristic yellow-orange feet. Juveniles can be differentiated from females by the black marks and overall paler colour of their feet. They also lack or have a very reduced white line behind their eyes.

This species is visually similar to another steamer duck species with which it shares its range: the flying steamer duck. Although they are difficult to tell apart in the field, the Falkland steamer duck has shorter wings and tail, and a thicker neck and bill. Finally, as its name implies, the flying steamer duck is capable of flight while the Falkland steamer duck is strictly flightless. This last characteristic is difficult to see in the field because the flying steamer duck seldom flies and is often seen walking or swimming.

Historical description
Charles Darwin devoted two paragraphs to this bird (or the similar flying steamer duck) in The Voyage of the Beagle, having observed them at the Falkland Islands in 1833:

Habitat and Distribution 

The species' distribution is limited to the Falkland Islands in the South Atlantic Ocean. These ducks are year-round residents of the islands and the surrounding archipelago, and can be found mainly on rugged shores and in sheltered bays. The Falkland steamer ducks also venture inland in freshwater ponds up to 400m from the coast.

Behavior 
This species spends most of its time in small family groups composed of the female, the male and the chicks. However, non-breeding adults and juveniles might gather in larger groups of up to 300. These gatherings can happen at any time of the year and their purpose remains unknown.

Vocalization 
The Falkland steamer duck's vocalizations are similar to those of other steamer ducks, namely of the flying steamer duck. Males can be heard year-round but they are especially loud during the breeding season during which they use their vocalization to defend their territory. Their call consists of loud rasping whistles and repeated sharp ticking notes. Females usually sing with the males and produce deeper grunts. This bird is considered to be a loud bird and can easily be heard on and around the shores of the Falklands.

Diet 
The Falkland steamer duck feeds mainly on marine mollusks and, occasionally, on crustaceans. Although they can upend when feeding in shallower waters, they mainly dive to find their preys on the sea floor. They used their small wings and large feet to effectively propel themselves in the water. Interestingly, they have been observed to feed collectively with many individuals diving at the same time.

Reproduction 
The breeding season lasts from mid September to the end of December, but breeding can take place year-round. Adults breed in single pairs on and around the coastline. Males become very territorial and fights are common. Males and sometimes females will used their spurs on their wings to violently hit other challengers. These fights are known for their extreme violence and can result in severe injury or even death. Once mating has occurred, females lay between 4 and 12 eggs in down-lined nests and incubate them for about 34 days. The males stay with the female to defend the nest but are not involved in the incubation process. Every day, the female carefully covers the eggs with plant material before leaving the nest for 15 to 30 minutes to bath and preen. The nest is usually located in tall grass, piles of sea weed, rocks, and even in unoccupied Magellanic penguin burrows. Chicks weigh 83g upon hatching and stay with the adults for 12 weeks. When they hatch and for the first 12 weeks, the chicks are covered in brown and white duvet. They have distinctive white markings on the side of their head. Around the 12 week mark, chicks get their first plumage and sexual maturity is reached after 14 to 24 months. Adults can live for up to 20 years old in captivity but there is no information on the longevity of wild individuals.

Predation 
The adult Falkland steamer duck does not have many predators. Predation by sea lions and seals is rare but has been documented. The main predation pressure is on fledglings which are routinely picked up by kelp gulls and skuas. Egg harvesting used to be common in the island but humans have abandoned the practice since.

Conservation status 
The species is currently classified as Least Concern. During the last surveys between 1983 and 1993, between 9000 and 16000 breeding pairs were recorded and they estimated the population to be between 27 000 and 48 000 individuals. Another survey from 1997 estimated the population at 32 000 individuals. A recent study has shed some light on the negative effect of invasive species on shore bird populations in the Falklands. Scientists determined that rat-invested islands had lower numbers of many shorebirds including steamer ducks. Another possible source of concern comes from oil spills. The species has a limited distribution and its food supply could be severely affected by a large-scale release of oil in and around the Falklands. Although these anticipated threats should be considered, the population is currently stable and there is no immediate source of concern for this species.

External links 

 https://ebird.org/species/falstd1 eBird Falkland steamer duck
 https://falklandsconservation.com/falklands-steamer-duck/ Falklands Conservation
 https://birdsoftheworld.org/bow/species/falstd1/cur/introduction Cornell Lab of Ornithology

References

Tachyeres
Flightless birds
Birds of the Falkland Islands
Birds described in 1790
Taxa named by John Latham (ornithologist)